Hardikar may refer to:

People

 Manohar Hardikar (1936–1995), Indian cricket player
 Narayan Subbarao Hardikar (1889–1975), Indian freedom fighter and politician

Buildings
 Hardikar Hospital, a hospital in Pune, India